Determined to Develop is a registered 501(c)(3) United States charity working in Malawi, Africa. Determined to Develop operates from the Chilumba area in the Karonga District of Northern Malawi. Determined to Develop was established in 2009 by founder Matt Maroon as a way to help the people of Malawi.

Mission Statement
To empower, through education, the people of Malawi to become agents of development for their families, communities, country, and world.

History
Determined to Develop was established in 2009 by founder Matt Maroon who has lived in Malawi since 2006. After obtaining his graduate degree in anthropology, Matt moved to a rural part of Malawi and began laying the foundations for an on-the-ground operations, partnering with Malawian people and connecting with the community.

Determined to Develop moved from a passive to an active Board in 2013 and was able to recruit directors who would ensure planning, oversight and funding was achieved in the long term. Within Malawi, Determine to Develop founder Matt Maroon is also the country manager for Lattitude Global Volunteering, a UK based charity which provides service opportunities for young people to teach in secondary schools within Malawi. Matt also formerly lectured at the University of Livingstonia where he held the post of Dean of the College of Social Sciences. In 2021, Geoff Mzembe, a Malawian, was promoted to Executive Director. Geoff has been with Determined to Develop since the beginning, starting with the project in 2010. Geoff has been an integral part of all projects from their inception. As Executive Director, Geoff leads the day-to-day operations of our team and programs. Geoff also coordinates all external and community relations, from our surrounding villages and schools to government-level stakeholders.

Wasambo High School
Determined to Develop annually hosts The Malawi Research Practicum and the Malawi Graduate Fellowship in training future human rights advocates and professionals through applied research and working with the community on critical human rights and development issues. Undertaken in partnership with the University of Dayton Department of Political Science , this project draws on transdisciplinary research and applied participatory international development insights to enable students from across the university, including Teacher Education - School of Education and Health Sciences and ETHOS Center - School of Engineering, to meaningfully participate in development and human rights work on a global scale. 

In 2017 and in partnership with the University of Dayton, Determined to Develop commissioned a new boarding high school, Wasambo Boys High School which has established a national reach within its first year of inception. The first-year class of 75 students, is led by an international faculty, combining a half Malawian and have western-based staff. The existing school is home to approximately 500 male students who not only attend class—they also live on the grounds. The proposed expansion will accommodate an additional 2,500 male and female students with greatly improved water facilities, capable of providing an estimated 500,000 liters per day. The school will be transformed from a high school into a technical college for post-secondary education.

As the organization grew, staff members were added to the team and programming expanded. Although progress was being made in each of the development sectors, it was the educational programming that was having the most significant impact. Meanwhile, meetings with community stakeholders and a thorough needs assessment concluded that education was the top development priority for the region. In 2017, Determined to Develop transitioned to an organization rooted in education.

Partnerships
The GoAbroad Foundation began partnering with Determined to Develop as a Beneficiary Organization Partner in September 2019, after being introduced to their programs and mission through the Give Together Program outreach program.

External links
 
 Guidestar
 GoAbroad Foundation
 UD Center for Student Involvement
 Linkedin
 Charity Navigator

References

Development charities based in the United States
Education in Malawi
Foreign charities operating in Malawi